Horayot ("Decisions") is a tractate in Seder Nezikin in the Talmud. 
In the Mishnah, this is the tenth and last tractate in Nezikin; in the Babylonian Talmud the ninth tractate; in the Jerusalem Talmud the eighth. It consists of three chapters in the Mishnah and two in the Tosefta. The tractate mainly discusses laws pertaining to erroneous rulings by a Jewish court, as well as unwitting actions performed by leading authorities of the Jewish people, and the sacrificial offerings (Hebrew korban, plural korbanot) that might be brought as a consequence of these actions. The conclusion of the tractate (12a-13b) deals with the prioritization of korbanot in the temple and explores the question of how to quantify human life in emergency situations.

Mishnah

The Mishnah of Horayot is the final work of Nezikin. Horayot contains three chapters. There are twenty paragraphs of Mishna, or twenty mishnayot, within the three chapters. These chapters deal with the verses in the Torah that specify different procedures for the sin offering brought by a private individual, an anointed priest, a nasi, and an entire community. The "community's" offering is understood to be that brought when the community has followed an erroneous ruling by the higher court. The sages understand the second passage in Numbers to be referencing the specific sin of unintentional idolatry committed by the congregation.

Chapter 1 – Sacrifice for unintentional sins
Maimonides sums up the conditions necessary for the bringing of such a sacrifice, found in the first and second chapters, as follows: (1) the head of the Sanhedrin and all its members must have been present when the decision was rendered; (2) every one of them must have been fully qualified to serve as a member of that body; (3) the decision must have been passed by a unanimous vote; (4) the error must concern a Biblical law; (5) at least a majority of the people must have followed the decision in practice; (6) those who followed the decision in practice must have been unaware of the mistake, and must have supposed that they were acting in accordance with law; (7) the error must have been due merely to ignorance of a matter of detail, and not to ignorance of the existence of the whole Biblical law in question. Unless these conditions are present, every one of those who has acted in accordance with the erroneous enactment must bring an individual offering.

Chapter 2 – The unintentional sins of the High Priest and King

The anointed priest who had interpreted some Biblical law erroneously, and acted accordingly, was required to bring a special sacrifice. The same conditions that governed the case of an erroneous ruling of the court with regard to the practice of the community governed also the erroneous decision of the anointed priest with regard to his own practice. The laws regarding the special sacrifice of the Nasi are also discussed in this chapter.

Chapter 3 – Precedence
In the cases of the anointed priest and the nasi, whose tenure of office is temporary, a question might arise as to the kind of sacrifice they must bring for sins committed before entering their offices, or after leaving them. If the sin was committed before they assumed office, they were both regarded as private individuals. If the sin was committed after they left their offices, the nasi was regarded as an individual, while the status of the anointed priest was unchanged. The Mishna (10a) states that the Nasi is the king, deriving this from the verse in Lev.4:22 that "all the commandments of the Lord his God." This verse must be referring to the king, who alone has only God above him.

The Mishnah clarifies the meaning of the Hebrew word "Mashiach," anointed one or messiah, in the context of the high priesthood. The "anointed priest" is obligated to bring the bull as an offering for an unwitting sin, but the High Priest who is not anointed (referred to as the High Priest of multiple garments, because of his extended duties during the Yom Kippur rites) does not bring that bull offering for unwitting sin. The Mishna states that there are two unique differences between the High Priest currently serving in that position and a High Priest who is not in the active role: 1. The serving High Priest brings the bull offering on Yom Kippur; and 2) the daily gift offering of flour is prepared by the serving High Priest. The Mishna begins a process of prioritizing distribution of charity moneys or lost objects to people based on their gender or title. The Mishna orders people in rank from priests to slaves in terms of priority — priests, Levites, Israelites, illegitimates, Nethinim (the alleged descendants of the  Gibeonites), proselytes, and then freed slaves. However, the Mishna then states that the list of prioritization is overridden by one's level of scholarship or piety: "This is only when all other things are equal, but in the case of an ignorant priest and a scholar who is an illegitimate mamzer, the latter must precede the priest in all honors" (Hor. 13a).

Talmud 
Tractate Horayot in the Babylonian Talmud consists of only fourteen pages. It is the shortest tractate of gemara in the Babylonian Talmud. In many editions it is printed together with tractate Avodah Zarah. The gemara is mainly devoted to the interpretation of the laws of the Mishnah dealing with sacrifices for unintentional sin, with a few aggadic digressions in the third chapter. The commentary attributed to Rashi is more profuse here than in other parts of the Talmud.  There is reason to believe that this commentary attributed to Rashi on Horayot was actually composed by the school of Rabbeinu Gershom. The Tosafot published in the Vilna Edition Shas extend only to the first two chapters, the style and method, mainly of an interpretive nature, being very different from those of the tosafot to other books. In the Vilna edition, besides the commentary of Rabbeinu Hananel, there is a commentary called Tosafot HaRosh, attributed to Asher ben Jehiel. The earliest printed editions of the Babylonian Talmud from Venice forward included the writings of the Jerusalem Talmud on tractate Horayot at the end of the printing. This was done because the printers were not able to find extensive writings of the Tosafot on Horayot. Revisions or minor edits on the text of Horayot were done in each printed edition.

Chapter 1 of Babylonian Talmud Horayot 

The first Mishnah discussed the authority of the sages and the responsibility to act autonomously and not follow a misguided ruling.  A sage who is expert in halakha and knows that the court was mistaken in its ruling, should not follow a misguided ruling of the court and perform a forbidden action. This applies to an individual who has great understanding of halakha.  However, an individual who is not an expert and does not know that the court's ruling was indeed  misguided would be exempt from punishment, were he to transgress a commandment through following the court's incorrect ruling.

From this first Mishnah and talmudic discussion that follows the conclusion is drawn that individuals who are expert in halakha are obligated to weigh their internal truth and autonomous decision before acting on halakhic matters.  As one modern writer notes, the "inner truth" of halakha takes precedence over a court's instructions, especially when the court's instructions require one to transgress halakha. The Mishna calls for experts on halakha to be independent in reaching halakhic conclusions.

The gemara rules that each tribe in Israel is considered as a congregation, after the verse "And Jehoshaphat stood in the congregation." However, the bull that atones for the communal transgression is only brought when the majority of tribes or majority of Israel population err and follow a mistaken ruling. Twelve bulls are offered at the Temple for a sin of the entire people, but if it is a sin of idol worship then twelve bulls and twelve goats are sacrificed.

The gemara proceeds to further limit the cases in which a court would bring a bull that atones for communal transgression. The only times when the bull is offered to atone for communal transgression is when the entire congregation sinned based on court ruling on a detail of mitzvah prohibited in the Torah; i.e., no bull would be brought if the court annulled an entire negative prohibition and the congregation blindly followed them.  Likewise, no bull atoning for communal transgression would be brought if the court ruled on a matter that is so obvious that even the most straightforward reading of the Hebrew Bible would lead one to realize that the court is mistaken. In the language of the Talmud, if the matter is such that even the Sadducees acknowledge it is a prohibited mitzvah in the Torah, no bull would be brought in such a case of communal transgression following a court's unwitting ruling.

Chapter 2 of Babylonian Talmud Horayot 

Chapter two begins with the words "the Rulings of the Anointed Priest." Chapter two deals with the sacrificial offerings brought as a result of unwitting sin. The gemara understands Leviticus 4:3 "guilt upon the people" as teaching that the anointed priest and the king bring a sacrifice as a consequence of their unwitting actions similar to the "guilt upon the people." This means that just as in the case of the people at large, who bring a sacrifice after transgressing as a result of mistaken rulings, so likewise in the case of the anointed priest and the king (7b). The High Priest brings the sacrifice of a bull only after he rules and then acts on that mistaken ruling in error, a case that parallels the sacrifice of a bull by the people at large; i.e., when the unwitting action was committed after a mistaken ruling was issued.  
The anointed priest does not bring an offering if his transgression was not based on a mistaken ruling. There is a discussion of the status of the anointed priest parallel to the Sanhedrin (7b). Rav Pappa teaches that the case in question is one in which both the anointed priest was a distinguished Torah scholar with the same authority to issue rulings as the Sanhedrin (7b). The anointed priest does not bring a provisional guilt offering in cases of doubt with regard to his transgression. Within the category of the sin offering, there is a subcategory of sliding scale offerings that individuals bring based on their financial standing. The anointed priest does bring the provisional guilt-offering in cases that an individual would. 
The Mishnah (9a) teaches that for offerings in which the penalty is kareth for intentional violation, the individual brings a sacrifice if he transgressed unwittingly.  In this specific case of unwitting transgression, the Nasi/ king  should bring a male goat, and not the female goat, (Heb: seira), or ewe (Heb: kivsa) that would be brought as a sin offering by the people here and elsewhere.  In contrast, the anointed priest and the Sanhedrin would bring the bull, as was mentioned previously. However, if the sin which was transgressed unwitting after a mistaken ruling was a sin of idolatry, then the king would bring a female goat as a sin offering, as would the anointed priest and the regular individual. The gemara (9a-9b) proceeds to discuss the details of the provisional guilt offering, which the mishnah stated does not apply to the Sanhedrin or the anointed priest, but does apply to the individual and the Nasi.

Chapter 3 of Babylonian Talmud Horayot 
Chapter 3 opens with a discussion of the sequence of sin of the High Priest and the King, with the question being whether those figures would be responsible for making atonement on transgressions committed prior to attaining the office, and similar matters. The king's sacrifice for an unwitting sin is that of a male goat, in contrast to the female goat or ewe brought by the common person, and this true even if the sin took place before he became king. When an apostate sins unwittingly, he does not bring a sin offering. (Hor.11a) The sages seek to define the parameters of apostasy in the context of sins of pleasure contrasted with sins to anger. (Hor. 11a) The chapter also discusses personal status of individuals in comparison to figures who have status accorded to them on account of the office they hold or their lineage. Other concepts raised by the sages in chapter 3 include that of "a transgression for the sake of heaven."  Rav Nachman bar Yitzchak says: A transgression performed for the sake of Heaven is greater than a mitzva performed not for its own sake, as it is stated: “Blessed above women shall be Yael, the wife of Heber the Kenite, above women in the tent shall she be blessed” (Judges 5:24).(Hor.10b)
 
The laws of anointing oil for the Kings are outlined, including the history of the practice in Horayot 11b-12a, and also in the Jerusalem Talmud on Horayot 3:4, 47c. The sages describe how anointing oil was made only one time in history by Moses (Ex.30:31-33).  The original amount that Moses prepared was used by Aaron and his descendants until it was hidden by Josiah. The High Priest and the "priest anointed for war" (Deut. 20:2) were the only priests anointed with that special oil. The High Priest and anointed were anointed with sacred oil during the First Temple, but the high priests who came afterward in the second temple relied on a different oil. The sacred oil prepared by Moses was used for the High Priest for the kings from Davidic line in the First Temple, but davidic kings whose succession to the monarchy was unquestioned were not anointed. After King Josiah hid the original anointing oil, a balsamic oil recipe was used in the time of the Second Temple. The sages state that, "One anoints the kings only upon a spring," as an omen so that their rule will be drawn out in time in the manner of water flowing from a spring (Hor 12a). This is derived from the story of the anointing of Solomon (I Kings 1:33-34). The anointing oil for David and his descendants was done from a horn, but for Saul from a cruse. The kings would be anointed by placing the oil around their head in a crown-like manner, but the priests would have the oil placed from their eyes to the head in the manner of the Greek letter chai X.
 
The differences between the High Priest and the ordinary priest are reviewed (Hor. 12b). In contrast to the ordinary priest, the High Priest is forbidden to marry a widow and is obligated to marry a virgin. The High Priest may not become ritually impure for the mitzvah of burial of a close relative. The High Priest tears his garments in mourning in a different way than the ordinary priest. The High Priest participates in bringing Temple offerings, even if this were to be immediately after the death of a close relative, i.e. during the time of aninut.
The gemara (12b) proceeds to explicate an argument between Rav (Abba Arikha) and Shmuel (Samuel of Nehardea) regarding how the High Priest tears his garment in an expression of mourning in accordance with the Mishnah. Rav says that the High Priest tears the cloth at the bottom edge of the garment, but Shmuel says he tears from below the neckline. The gemara explicates that the position of Shmuel is partially in accord with that expressed by Rav Yehuda (Judah bar Ilai). Rav Yehuda believes that any tear that does not break the neckline is worthless, but Rav Yehuda also believes that the High Priest should not tear anything at all.  Shmuel's position, however, is that it is not a legally binding tear for the High Priest to rip a garment from below the neckline without rending it there, but the tear itself, minor as it is, shows that the High Priest is experiencing grief after the passing of his relatives.
The Talmud next explicates the statement in the Mishnah that "Any mitzvah that is more frequent than another mitzva precedes that other mitzva" when the fulfillment of two commandments may occur at the same time. The Talmud explains that the source for this is from the verse (Numbers 28:23) "Beside the burnt offering of the morning, which is for a daily burnt-offering." A baraita of the sages is then cited that orders the priority of those sacrifices from the preceding conversation: that of the bull of the anointed priest, the bull of the congregation, and the bull for an unwitting communal sin, and idol worship. The principal that all sin offerings precent burnt offerings is established.  Likewise, it is taught that the goat sacrifice for idol worship precedes the goat of the king, because the communal precedes the individual (Hor. 13a). 
The Talmud continues the discussion about priority or precedence in circumstances of saving a life or rescuing an individual from captivity. The principal is stated that, "A Torah scholar precedes the king of Israel because in the case of a sage who dies we have no one like him, but in the case of a king of Israel who dies, all of Israel are fit for royalty." This overriding condition aside, the Talmud quantifies the priority of life in a hypothetical case where one life should be saved with triage decisions based on title or rank, such that higher priests or administrators in the Temple should have their lives be saved first. Similarly, a triage of life importance based on hierarchy of class is categorized such that the order is from highest to lowest: Priest, Levite, Israelite, mamzer, Nethinim, convert, and lastly the slave. The slave is last because of the curse of Ham. The overriding caveat to this discussion, however, was already provided by the Mishnah. This triage based on class hierarchy is only applicable if they are of equal wisdom, but a wise mamzer precedes others of higher social rank.

Aggada 

Chapter 3 of Horayot unlike the previous two chapters includes narrative stories about the sages, or aggada.  Horayot 10a tells the story of rabbi Gamliel and Rabbi Yehoshua on a boat journey. The story has been cited as the first periodic reference to Halley's Comet in world literature. The story is told that:

The story from Horayot is a definite identification of a comet with an orbit of seventy years. Halley's Comet was seen in 66 CE when Rabban Gamaliel II and Rabbi Yehoshua, a.k.a. Joshua ben Hananiah, were beginning their careers as sages. Dr Jeremy Brown has stated that it is "both self-evident and beyond question" that Rabbi Yehoshua should be credited as the first to describe the time frame for the comet known today as Halley's Comet.  This first identification of Halley's Comet by Rabbi Yehoshua is likewise noted by R. Patai in The Children of Noah: Jewish Seafaring in Ancient Times (Princeton University Press 1998) and I. A. Ben Yosef in his monograph The Concept of Nature in Classical Judaism. 
The story about Rabban Gamliel and Rabbi Yehoshua was cited in the Talmud to exemplify what it means for a leader to be a servant of the people. The sages had told the story of King Uzziah who was removed from his position of kingship after becoming a leper. The Bible (II Kings 15:5) states that he went to a house of freedom after he was removed from being king. Until then, the sages explain, he was a servant of the people. Similarly, Rabbi Yehoshua tells Rabban Gamliel on the boat about two great sages, Rabbi Elazar Hisma and Rabbi Yohanan ben Gudgeda, who though brilliant have no food or garments. Rabban Gamliel sends for them to become servants of the people (Hor 10b).

Another story that is told in the third chapter informs us of the bifurcation of powers in Jewish life in Palestine and Babylonia. Rabbi Judah ha-Nasi asks his colleague if he were to sin as the Nasi, or Patriarch in Palestine, would he be liable to bring a male goat as a sin offering in the same manner that a king should. Rabbi Hiyya, Hiyya bar Abba, responds that the offering would be that of a commoner; i.e., a female goat or ewe. The reason for this being that there was a corresponding center of power in Babylonia of the Exilarch so Rabbi Yehuda HaNasi was not akin to a king, especially since Palestine was under the authority of Babylonia in the opinion attributed to Rabbi Hiyya (Hor.11b). Rav Safra thereon expounds the verse in Gen. 49:10 that in Babylonia the Exilarch had political authority (i.e. the scepter) but in Palestine they had religious authority (scribal staff).
The sages proceed to discuss various legends regarding the anointment oil of the High Priest in the Bible and the First Temple Kings of Judah and Israel. Rav Pappa states that they used balsam oil, or balm of Gilead for the kings of Israel and for King Jehoahaz of Judah. The reason why they used balsamic oil for the anointing of King Jehoahaz is because King Josiah had hidden away the anointing oil of Moses and Aaron together with the manna and Aaron's rod with its almonds and blossoms. 

Horayot 12a discusses augury and acceptable predictors of the future. Abaye notes the tradition of eating certain foods on Rosh Hashana,as squash, fenugreek, leeks, beets and dates are foods of a good omen.  Superstitious practices for ensuring a successful business or trip are recorded by Rabbi Ammi. It is noted there that some would seek to see their shadow in a dark space (or shadow of a shadow) to know if they would be successful on their business trip. This superstitious practice noted in Tractate Horayot was discussed by David Abudarham in Seville in the fourteenth century and by many other commentaries discussing augury practices of seeing shadows. Abudarham notes that on the night of Hoshana Rabba people would walk out naked in the dark covered only in a cloth and see if they could see the shadow of their head. He cites this passage from Horayot 12a as a text arguing that the practice was not legitimate. 
The conclusion of Horayot deals with precedence in sacrifices and prioritizes the life of the learned sage above all else. In this context the gemara informs us that it was the custom to rise in the study hall at the entrance of the sages bearing the title of Nasi, Hakham, and deputy Nasi. Rabban Shimon ben Gamliel was the Nasi at that time and thought there should be distinction made in the practice of standing for him and those of lower rank to him, namely Rav Meir and Rav Natan.

While Rabbi Meir and Rabbi Natan plotted to ask Rabban Shimon ben Gamliel to teach Uktzim, Rabbi Ya'akov ben Korshei heard them. He proceeded to upend their plan by reciting Uktzim by Rabbi Shimon ben Gamliel so that he would know the tractate. The next day when Meir and Natan entered the study hall, the Nasi was already well versed in Uktzim and taught it in the study hall when they asked him to recite. In response to their plot, the Nasi blocked the two conspirators from entering the place of study. The two figures, Natan and Meir, continued to direct the conversation within the study hall even while they were blocked from entering, by means of throwing little notes into the hall. Rabbi Yosei said to the other sages, "How is it that the Torah is outside (the study hall) and we are inside?" The Nasi Rabban Shimon ben Gamliel admitted them but censured them by erasing their names from their teachings, such that Rabbi Meir's teachings were recorded as being taught by "Others" and Rabbi Natan's teachings were recorded as taught by, "Some say." (Hor. 13b)

Placement in the Order Nezikin 
The topics of Horayot, relating largely to sacrificial offerings, may seemingly have fit well within the Order of Kodashim (holies). In fact, Maimonides codifies the laws of Horayot in his Mishneh Torah in Sefer Korbanot, Hilkhot Shegagot or under the laws of Unintentional Sacrificial Offerings.  Maimonides explains the reason that the compilers of the Mishnah decided on placing Horayot last in the Order of Nezikin was because after they dealt with torts and the laws of capital punishment, and then with ethics in Pirkei Avot the sages felt it necessary to include a section on mistaken rulings.  Maimonides writes that we are all human and have the capacity for sin, and even the greatest of judges may issue mistaken rulings.

References

Further reading

 English contents of Steinfeld's work on Horayot at, http://www.biupress.co.il/files/202362.pdf